Haludpukur (also referred to as  Haludpukhur, Haldipokhar) is a census town in the Potka  CD block in the Dhalbhum subdivision of the Purbi Singhbhum district in the Indian state of Jharkhand.

Geography

Location                                  

Area overview 
The area shown in the map "forms a part of the Chota Nagpur Plateau and is a hilly upland tract".  The main rivers draining the district are the Subarnarekha and the Kharkai.The area lying between Jamshedpur and Ghatshila is the main industrial mining zone. The rest of the district is primarily agricultural. In the district, as of 2011,  56.9% of the population lives in the rural areas and a high 43.1% lives in the urban areas. 

Note: The map alongside presents some of the notable locations in the district. All places marked in the map are linked in the larger full screen map.

Demographics 
According to the 2011 Census of India, Haludpukhur had a total population of 10,485, of which 5,317 (51%) were males and 5,168 (49%) were females. Population in the age range 0-6 years was 1,517. The total number of literate persons in Haludpukhur was 7,082 (78.97% of the population over 6 years). 

(*For language details see Potka block#Language and religion)

Infrastructure 
Among the civic amenities, it had  of roads with open drains, the protected water supply involved hand pump, uncovered well. It had 1,741 domestic electric connections, 4 road lighting points. Among the medical facilities, it had 1 hospital (with 10 beds), 35 dispensaries, 35 health centres, 10 family welfare centres, 10 maternity and child welfare centres, 7 maternity homes, 2 nursing homes, 12 charitable hospitals/ nursing homes, 1 veterinary hospital, 4 medicine shops. It had 1 non-formal education centre (Sarva Shiksha Abhiyan). Among social, cultural and recreational facilities, it had 1 stadium, 1 auditorium/ community hall. It produced bamboo baskets and leaf plates. It had the branch offices of 2 nationalised banks, 1 cooperative bank, 1 agricultural credit society.

Transport 
Haludpukur Railway Station is on the Tatanagar-Badampahar branch line .

Education 
Government Vidyaniketan Haldipokhar is a Hindi-medium coeducational institution established in 1960. It has facilities for teaching from class IX to class XII. The school has a playground and a library with 3,500 books, and has 2 computers for teaching and learning purposes. 

Giri Bharati High School Haldipokhar is a Hindi-medium coeducational institution established in 1948. It has facilities for teaching in classes IX and X. The school has a playground, a library with 2,640 books and 1 computer for teaching and learning purposes.

References 
 

 

Cities and towns in East Singhbhum district